In part of the Indo-Tibetan Vajrayana Buddhist tradition, thirty-two Kings of Shambhala reside in a mythical kingdom.

Legend
The first notable king, King Suchandra (sometimes wrongly Sanskritized as "Chandrabhadra," Tib. Dawa Sangpo), is reported to have requested teaching from the Buddha that would allow him to practice the dharma without renouncing his worldly enjoyments and responsibilities. In response to this request, it is said the Buddha gave him the first Kalachakra root tantra.  By practicing the Kalachakra, the whole of Shambhala eventually became an enlightened society. 

King Suchandra was followed by an additional six Dharmarajas (Truth Kings); his eighth successor, Manjushrikirti, was the first of the 25 Kalki Kings (Tib. Rigden, wylie: rigs ldan).

Note that many of the kings' names are often wrongly Sanskritized (i.e., back-translated from the Tibetan) in Western publications.

The Seven Dharmarājas
The Seven Dharmarājas (Tib. Chögyal, Wylie chos rgyal) are:
Suchandra, or Chandrabhadra (Tib. Dawa Sangpo, Wylie zla ba bzang po) c. 900 to 876 BC. Note: the Kalachakra calculations put the life of Śākyamuni Buddha quite a bit earlier than what is generally accepted, and the Tibetans produced a number of divergent calculations of the dates listed here.
Devendra (Tib. Lhayi Wang) (876-776 BC) - Fond of Sentient Beings
Tejasvin, or Taji (Tib. Ziji Chän) (776-676 BC) Bearer of the Dharma Wheel and the Auspicious Conch
Somadatta, or Chandradatta (Tib. Dawä Jin)  (676-576) Lord of Speakers
Deveśvara, or Sureśvara (Tib. Lhaji Wangchug)  (576-476) Destroyer of the City of Delusion 
Chitrarupa, or Viśvamūrti (Tib. Natshog Zug)  (476-376) Conqueror of False Leaders, Holding a Lotus
Devesha, or Sureśana (Tib. Lhayi Wangdän) (376-276) Cutter of Delusion, Uprooter of Karma and Klesha

The Twenty-Five Kalki

The most recent 25 of the 32 Kings of Shambhala are known as Kalki kings (Tib. Rigden, wylie: rigs ldan), meaning "Holder of the Castes." The Kalki King is said to reside upon a "Lion Throne" in Kalapa, the capital city of the Kingdom. The Kalki are holders of the Kalachakra (Wheel of Time), which are the teachings of Buddha Shakyamuni passed down from the original seven Dharmarajas of Shambhala.

As explained by Buddhist scholar John R. Newman, the Kalki are often erroneously termed "Kulika" by Tibetan Buddhist scholars unfamiliar with the original Sanskrit texts:

 ".. . so far no one seems to have examined the Sanskrit Kalachakra texts.  The Buddhist myth of the Kalkis of Shambhala derives from the Hindu Kalki of Shambhala myths contained in the Mahabharata and the Puranas. The Vimalaprabha even refers to the Kalki Purana, probably the latest of the upapuranas. This relationship has been obscured by western scholars who have reconstructed the Tibetan translation term rigs ldan as "Kulika." Although Tibetan rigs ldan is used to translate the Sanskrit kulika in other contexts, here it always represents Sanskrit kalkin (possessive of kalkah; I have used the nominative kalki)."

Kalki
Manjushríkírti, or Yaśas (Tib. Jampal Dakpa; "Mañjuśrī Yaśas") Manjushríkírti is said to have lived in the second century BCE. He formatted the Kālachakra teachings into a condensed and simplified structure termed the "Śrī Kālachakra" or "Laghutantra." He also converted a group of non-Buddhist Brahman priests of Shambhala to Buddhism and gave them the Kālachakra initiation, thereby uniting all inhabitants into one "vajra caste," or family of tantric practitioners. Yaśas is said to have predicted the coming of "Barbarian Dharma" after 800 years (about 600 CE), which some observers take to be Islam. (The Sanskrit term translated into English as "barbarian" was used to refer to all non-Buddhists.)
Puṇḍarīka (Tib. Pema Karpo) (176–76 BCE) White Lotus, cherished by the Lord of Potala. King Puṇḍarīka wrote a commentary called "Vimalaprabha" (Skt.) or "Stainless Light." This text, together with the Śrī Kālachakra, is the source text of the Kālachakra system as it is now practiced. Other practice texts are commentaries on these two. The Dalai Lamas are said to be incarnations of Puṇḍarīka.
Bhadra (Tib. Zangpo) (76 BCE–227 CE) One who Rules by the Thousand-spoked Wheel.
Vijaya (Tib. Nampar Gyäl) (227–327) Attractor of Wealth, Victorious in War.
Sumitra (Tib. Shenyen Zangpo) (327–427) Integrator of Method and Wisdom, Victorious over Samsara.
Raktapāṇi (Tib. Rinchen Chag) (427–527) Holder of the Blissful Vajra and Bell.
Viṣnugupta (Tib. Kyabjug Bäpa) (527–627) Smiling Holder of the Trident and Rosary.
Sūryakīrti, or Arkakirti (Tib. Nyima Drag) (627–727) Annihilator of Wild Demons.
Subhadra (Tib. Shintu Zangpo) (727–827) Holder of the Sword and Shield.
Samudra Vijaya (Tib. Gyatso Namgyäl) (827–927) Annihilator of all types of Devils.
Aja, or Durjaya (Tib. Gyälka) (927–1027) Who binds with Unbreakable Iron Chains.
Sūrya, or Sūryapada (Tib. (Wonang) Nyima) (1027–1127) All-Pervading, Radiant Jewel Light.
Viśvarūpa, or Chitrarupa (Tib. Natshog Zug(chän)) (1127–1227) Holder of the Vajra Prod and Noose.
Shashiprabha (Also Sasiprabha or Chandraprabha, Tib. Dawäi Ö) (1227–1327) Lord of Secret Mantras, Holder of the Wheel and Conch.
Ananta, Thayä (Tib. Nyen) (1327–1427) Holder of the Mallet that Crushes False Ideas.
Śrīpāla or Pārthiva (Tib. Sakyong) (1427–1527) Holder of the Cleaver that Cuts the Bonds of Ignorance.
Śrīpāla (Tib. Pälkyong) (1527–1627) Annihilator of the Host of Demons. 
Siṃha (Tib. Senge) (1627–1727) Who Stuns the Elephant with his Vajra.
Vikrānta (Tib. Nampar Nön) (1727–1827) Subduer of the Mass of Foes, the Inner and Outer Classes of Devils.
Mahābala  (Tib. Tobpo Che) (1827–1927) Tamer of all False Leaders by Means of the Sound of Mantra.
Aniruddha (Tib. Magakpa) (1927–2027) Who Draws and Binds the Entire Three Worlds. Aniruddha, the present Kalki king, was prophesied to rule during a time when Vajrayana Buddhism and the Kalachakra are nearly extinguished. 
Narasingha (Tib. Miyi Senge) (2027–2127) Ruling by the Wheel, Holding the Conch.
Maheśvara (Tib. Wangchug Che) (2127–2227) Victorious over the Armies of Demons.
Anantavijaya (Tib. Thaye Namgyäl) (2227–2327) Holder of the Vajra and Bell.
Rudra Chakrin (Tib. Dakpo Khorlocen) (2327–?) Forceful Wheel Holder. The final king prophesied in the Kalachakra, Rudra Chakrin is further prophesied to appear to all humanity in 2424, and to establish a planet-wide Golden Age subsequent to his defeat of degenerate world rulers.

Dalai Lama
The Dalai Lamas are said to be incarnations of the second Kalki, Pundarika. In particular, the Second, Seventh and Fourteenth (present) Dalai Lamas are said to have strong affinity to the Kalki kings, with the present Dalai Lama having to date offered the Kalachakra initiation thirty times.

The Lineage of Sakyong Kings
Followers of the contemporary Tibetan Buddhist teachers Chogyam Trungpa Rinpoche and his son Sakyong Mipham Rinpoche believe them to be intimately connected to the Kalki kings, and thus dedicated to propagating the wisdom of Shambhala to the world. The term "Sakyong" in Tibetan literally means "earth-protector," although it is colloquially understood to mean "King." The Sakyong King lineage is traditionally familial.

See also

Dalai Lamas
Kalachakra
Kalki
Kalki Purana
Panchen Lamas
Sakyong Mipham Rinpoche
Shambhala
Suchandra

Notes

External links

International Kalachakra Network

Shambhala vision
Tibetan Buddhist mythology